Amorphoscelis spinosa is a species of praying mantis found in Sri Lanka.

See also
List of mantis genera and species

References

Amorphoscelis
Insects of Sri Lanka
Insects described in 1942